Jochroa is a monotypic moth genus of the family Erebidae. Its only species, Jochroa chlorogastra, is found in Chile. Both the genus and the species were first described by Felder in 1874.

References

Calpinae
Monotypic moth genera
Endemic fauna of Chile